King Push – Darkest Before Dawn: The Prelude is the second studio album by American rapper Pusha T. It was released on December 18, 2015, by GOOD Music and Def Jam Recordings. The album was supported by three singles: "Untouchable", "M.F.T.R." featuring The-Dream and "Crutches, Crosses, Caskets". The album features guest appearances from The-Dream, Kanye West, ASAP Rocky, Ab-Liva, Beanie Sigel, Kehlani and Jill Scott, with production handled by a variety of high-profile record producers, including Kanye West, J. Cole, Timbaland, Q-Tip, Hudson Mohawke and Puff Daddy, among others.

The album serves as a prelude for his third solo album, Daytona (originally titled King Push), which was released on May 25, 2018. King Push – Darkest Before Dawn: The Prelude received widespread acclaim from critics, who highly praised its unique lyricism and experimental production.

Background 
In April 2013, in an interview with AskMen; Pusha T revealed that after the release of his debut album, he would be finishing the work on his second album, titled King Push.

In July 2014, in an interview with XXL; when asked about his plans for his next album King Push, Pusha T said: “This next album is like a heavy proclamation to me. I told people last year I had the 'Album Of the Year'. And I felt that I did. I really feel that King Push has to live up to that same hip-hop expectation… My goal is always to have 'hip-hop Album of the Year'.”

Release and promotion 
On November 19, 2014, Pusha T released the promotional single, titled "Lunch Money"; which was produced by Kanye West. In December 2014, Pusha T announced his second album King Push, for a Spring 2015 release. In May 2015, he had announced that his second album would be released in June 2015. In November 2015, Pusha T revealed that he would be releasing an album, before his much anticipated project King Push and that his album King Push - Darkest Before Dawn - The Prelude would be released on December 18, 2015.

In promotion for the album, Pusha T released a trailer for his short film on November 26, 2015. The short film was released on December 11, 2015, exclusively on TIDAL, starring Natalya Rudakova, Rotimi, and directed by Kid Art. The album was made available for pre-order on December 11 as well, with the songs "Untouchable", "M.F.T.R." and "Crutches, Crosses, Caskets", were released as "instant gratification tracks", to those who would be purchasing this album.

Music and lyrics 
For each of the singles "Untouchable", "M.F.T.R." and "Crutches, Crosses, Caskets", Pusha T premiered the lyrics on Genius, before releasing the audio, as a marketing technique.

Singles 
On November 12, 2015, Pusha T released a song, titled "Untouchable", as the first single for the album.

Critical reception 

Darkest Before Dawn received widespread acclaim from critics. At Metacritic, which assigns a normalized rating out of 100 to reviews from mainstream critics, the album received an average score of 85, based on 22 reviews. Christopher Weingarten of Rolling Stone stated, "Though hip-hop gets more melodic and vocally expressive every year, Pusha keeps his cadences steely and his bars hitting like haymakers, maintaining that ice-cold Nineties feel even when he’s taking on modern troubles." Corbin Reiff of The A.V. Club considered it a worthy prelude to King Push and praised the dark tone of the album, "The mood is set right from the beginning on “Intro,” which opens with an array of synth sounds reminiscent of the score to Stanley Kubrick's A Clockwork Orange before slamming into a rhythm that's all boom and no bap. That foreboding tone is carried forward through the rest of the record." Erin Lowers of Exclaim! wrote that "the weight of Darkest Before Dawn doesn't simply rest on Pusha T's lyrical weight (literal and figuratively), but also his ability to tap into the strengths of his producers, like Boi-1da's thunderous drums, Kanye West's soulful grandeur or Timbaland's unorthodox layering."

Track listing 

Notes
 signifies an additional producer.
"Intro" features additional vocals by Lee Sanchez and G Koop.

Sample credits
"Intro" contains a sample from a reference track made for Kanye West's Yeezus album titled "Louder" performed by Chantal Kreviazuk.
"Untouchable" contains a sample from "Think B.I.G." performed by The Notorious B.I.G., written by Christopher Wallace.
"M.P.A." contains a sample from "Konklusjon" performed by Good News, written by Finn Pedersen.
"Got Em Covered" contains an interpolation from "Squeeze 1st" performed and written by Shawn Carter and Ricardo Thomas.
"F.I.F.A." contains a sample from "Tout Au Pas" performed by Jean-Philippe Goude.
"Sunshine" contains an interpolation of "Workin' My Way" performed by Alexander, written by Gianfranco Reverberi, Claudio Ghiglino and Susan Duncan-Smith.

Charts

Weekly charts

Year-end charts

References

External links

2015 albums
Pusha T albums
Def Jam Recordings albums
GOOD Music albums
Albums produced by Boi-1da
Albums produced by Honorable C.N.O.T.E.
Albums produced by Frank Dukes
Albums produced by Hudson Mohawke
Albums produced by J. Cole
Albums produced by Q-Tip (musician)
Albums produced by Sean Combs
Albums produced by Timbaland